Matt "Money" Smith (born August 28, 1973) is an American sports radio personality, including play-by-play announcer for the Los Angeles Chargers.

Biography
Smith graduated from Morgan Park Academy in 1991. He attended Pepperdine University, graduating in 1995 with a double-major in political science and speech communication.

In 1995, Smith joined the program Kevin and Bean on KROQ 106.7 FM in Los Angeles. He was given the nickname "Money" when working with the show. From 2005 to 2009, he hosted the Los Angeles Lakers pregame, halftime and post-game shows (Lakers Zone) on AM 570.

On 8 January 2007 Smith began co-hosting the Petros and Money Show, with Petros Papadakis. 

On 6 June 2017 Smith was named lead play-by-play announcer for the radio broadcasts of the Los Angeles Chargers on KFI.

References

External links
The Petros and Money Show

Living people
American sports announcers
American radio personalities
College basketball announcers in the United States
College football announcers
Los Angeles Chargers announcers
National Basketball Association broadcasters
National Football League announcers
People from Belfast, Maine
Sportspeople from East Chicago, Indiana
Pepperdine University alumni
1973 births
Alliance of American Football announcers